Dilber Yunus (Pinyin: Dílǐbàiěr Yóunǔsī; born October 2, 1958) is a Uyghur lyric soprano with coloratura technique. She has been called the "Philomela of China," in reference to the Athenian King Pandion I's daughter, who, according to legend, turned into a nightingale. She is a citizen of Finland.

Life
Dilber was born in Kashgar, Xinjiang Uyghur Autonomous Region, China. She was admitted in 1976 to the Xinjiang Song and Dance Troupe. Four years later she enrolled in the Department of Vocal Music and Opera at Beijing's Central Music Conservatory and while still a student there won an award in the Finland International Opera Competition. In 1987 Dilber finished her master's degree at the Conservatory and promptly joined the roster of the Finnish National Opera company, later adding a position with Sweden's Malmo Opera. She twice won the Birgit Nilsson Stipend, in 1997 and 1998. Dilber Yunus has served as a distinguished professor in China Conservatory of Music between 2008 and 2018. In September 2018, she joined the Central Conservatory of Music and serves as a professor in the department of vocal arts and opera performance.

Dilber is considered to rank among the more accomplished singers of her generation in her voice category, with a clarion and powerful top. She has been praised for restraint in her use of ornamentation and for vocal balance. Among her recordings is an acclaimed La sonnambula by Bellini on which she sings Lisa, recorded live in Amsterdam in 1992 for the Naxos label.

Dilber gave hundreds of solo concerts and recitals around the world and performed the following roles in staged productions of operas:
 
The Queen of the Night in Mozart's Die Zauberflöte
Rosina in Rossini’s Il barbiere di Siviglia
Lisa in Bellini’s La sonnambula
Adina in Donizetti’s L'elisir d'amore
Marie in Donizetti’s La fille du régiment
Lucia in Donizetti’s Lucia di Lammermoor
Gilda in Verdi’s Rigoletto 
Nanetta in Verdi’s Falstaff 
Oscar in Verdi’s Un ballo in maschera
Olympia in Offenbach’s Les contes d'Hoffmann 
Sophie in Massenet’s Werther
a Flowermaiden in Wagner’s Parsifal
the title role in Stravinsky’s Le rossignol
Zerbinetta in Strauss’s Ariadne auf Naxos
Lauretta in Puccini’s Gianni Schicchi
Yang Caihong in Hao Weiya's A Village Teacher
Grandam in Lei Lei's Visitors on the Snow Mountain

See also
Ablajan Awut Ayup
Arken Abdulla

References

1958 births
Living people
21st-century Chinese women opera singers
Chinese operatic sopranos
Finnish operatic sopranos
Uyghurs
Singers from Xinjiang
People from Kashgar
20th-century Chinese women opera singers
Chinese emigrants to Finland
European people of Turkic descent
Naturalized citizens of Finland
21st-century Finnish women opera singers